Monosexuality is romantic or sexual attraction to members of one sex or gender only. A monosexual person may identify as heterosexual or homosexual. In discussions of sexual orientation, the term is chiefly used in contrast to bisexuality, or pansexuality and various other gender-neutral identities. It is sometimes considered derogatory or offensive by the people to whom it is applied, particularly gay men and lesbians. In blogs about sexuality, some have argued that the term "monosexuality" inaccurately claims that homosexuals and heterosexuals have the same privilege. However, some have used the term "monosexual privilege", arguing that biphobia is different from homophobia.

See also 

 Bisexual erasure
 Gynephilia and androphilia
 Lesbophobia

References 

Sexual orientation